MIRLET7B host gene (non-protein coding) is a protein in humans that is encoded by the MIRLET7BHG gene.

References 

Genes on human chromosome 22